The Solitude of Prime Numbers (2011) is the soundtrack for the film of the same name by Saverio Costanzo composed by Mike Patton. It contains all the music used in the film, and more that was rejected by the director. It also contains music inspired directly by Patton's reading of the book in the original Italian and English translations. The tracklist lists each song by chronological prime numbers, in reference to the film.

The song 'The Snow Angel' would later be featured prominently in the film The Place Beyond the Pines (2012), the next film that Mike Patton would compose a soundtrack for. An edited, slowed down version of the song was also used in its trailer.

Songs track listing

References 

Mike Patton albums
2011 soundtrack albums
Drama film soundtracks